Studio City Sound is a recording studio located in Studio City, California. Grammy Award winning mixer, Tom Weir, purchased Fidelity Studios from Artie Ripp in 2002 and has updated and operated the facility as Studio City Sound since that time. Weir's additional credits include, engineer, producer, mastering/remastering, composer, keyboards and programming, drums and vocals. Studio City Sound has three recording studios, configured with a blend of digital and analog recording equipment. Clients can monitor recording and mixing sessions via the Internet courtesy of Studio City Sound's, Telos Zephyr, ISDN capabilities.

Artists who have used Studio City Sound

Famous Dex
Trippie Redd
Juicy J
T.I.
A-Trak
D.R.A.M.
Louis the Child
Nelly
The Strokes
The Struts
Soulja Boy
MØ
Martin Solveig
Niia
Quadron
Hayley Kiyoko
The Monkees
Rod Stewart
Kelly Clarkson
Eric Benét
Meghan Trainor
Nightmare and the Cat
Ray Luzier
Chris Cornell
Andreas Carlsson
Warren G
Robby Krieger
Crooked X
Tom Morello
No Doubt
Pete Yorn
Keith Richards
Eric Clapton
Graham Nash
Willie Nelson
Ryan Adams
Trey Anastasio
Shaggy
Orianthi
The Roots
Bunny Wailer
Rahzel
Rachael Yamagata
Jessica Harper
JeA
Burning Brides 
Ronn Moss 
Jason Freese
Billy Burke
Bonnie Raitt
Chicago
Mary-Kate Olsen
Doris Roberts
David A. Stewart
Josh Freese
Ultravox 
Rashid Lanie 
EMI
Steve Martin
Heather Youmans
Jon MacLennan

Khaled
King Sunny Adé
Kailash Kher
Interscope
Capitol Records
Geffen Records
Wilmer Valderrama
Michaela Shiloh
Cindy Alexander
Exene Cervenka
Toots and The Maytals
Phantom Planet
John Oszajca
Brian Setzer
Scarlett Pomers
Tito Jackson
Michael Damian
Maya Rudolph
Carina Round
Mighty Mo Rodgers
Jim Keltner
Gary Sinise
The Go-Go's
Weezer
Dave Darling
Tom Whitlock
Danielle Brisebois
Autograph
Jason Schwartzman
Faith Evans
Lee Ann Womack
Katrina Carlson
Juke Kartel
Delaney Bramlett
Buzzcocks
Meredith Brooks
Lisa Loeb
Carmelite Sisters of the Most Sacred Heart of Los Angeles
Liel Kolet
Andranik Madadian
Nelson
System of a Down
Verne Troyer
GM Voices

LMFAO
Wailing Souls
Neil Peart
Limp Bizkit
Natasha Bedingfield
Alanis Morissette
Boxing Gandhis
MC Hammer
Gary Myrick
Kevin Coleman
Q'Viva! The Chosen Live
Johnny Mathis
Edward Asner 
Blondie
Tracy Byrd
Pam Tillis 
Matt Laug
Mel Torme
Up All Night 
Tajči
Surfdog Records 
A&M Records
Universal Studios
Rounder Records
Moondance Alexander
Rooney
Daren Kagasoff
Tim Pierce
Runner Runner
Loomis Fall
Buddy Miles
Toots Hibbert
Biffy Clyro
Gary Wright 
Kyosuke Himuro
Player
Wicked
George Watsky
Flicka 2
A Princess for Christmas
The Young and the Restless
The Bold and the Beautiful

Studio City Sound roster of session musicians:

 Josh Freese – drums 
 Matt Laug – drums 
 Luis Conte – percussionist 
 Tim Pierce – guitar 
 Paul Bushnell – bass guitar  
 Lance Morrison - bass guitar 
 Nick Lane – trombone and brass arrangements  
 Steve Madaio – trumpet and brass arrangements 
 Blues Saraceno – guitar 
Jon MacLennan- guitar, banjo, mandolin, ukulele, vocals and backing-vocals

References

External links 
 Studio City Sound
 Studio City Sound on YouTube

Audio engineering
Companies based in Los Angeles
Recording studios in California